Pimienta is a Spanish word, meaning "pepper". It may refer to:

 Pimienta, Honduras, a municipality in the Cortés department
 rana pimienta ("pepper frog"), a local name of the frog Leptodactylus labyrinthicus
 Pimienta (film), a 1966 Argentine film

People 
 Bernardo Gómez-Pimienta (born 1961), Mexican architect and furniture designer
 Francisco Díaz Pimienta (1594–1652), Spanish naval officer
 Francisco Javier García Pimienta (born 1974), Spanish retired football player and football manager 
 Juan de Torrezar Díaz Pimienta (died 1782), Spanish military officer and colonial official
 Lido Pimienta (born 1986), Colombian-Canadian musician
 Pavel Pimienta (born 1976), volleyball player from Cuba
 Raymondt Pimienta (born 1982), Aruban football player

See also 
 Pimenta (disambiguation)